Jari Antero Koskinen (born 11 June 1960) is a Finnish politician who was Minister for Agriculture and Forestry of Finland from 2011 to 2014,  as well as a former representative of the National Coalition Party in the Parliament of Finland.  He also served as Minister for Agriculture and Forestry in Paavo Lipponen's second Cabinet from 2002 to 2003.

In 2015 Koskinen was nominated as the CEO of the Association of Finnish Local and Regional Authorities. He remained in the position until resigning himself in August 2018.

References

1960 births
Living people
People from Hämeenlinna
National Coalition Party politicians
Ministers of Agriculture of Finland
Members of the Parliament of Finland (1995–99)
Members of the Parliament of Finland (1999–2003)
Members of the Parliament of Finland (2003–07)
Members of the Parliament of Finland (2007–11)
Finnish foresters